Charles Walter Hall (August 24, 1863 – June 24, 1921) was a professional baseball player who was an outfielder in the American Association for the 1887 New York Metropolitans. After his baseball career, he became a physician and practiced in Tacoma, Washington.

External links

1863 births
1921 deaths
Major League Baseball outfielders
19th-century baseball players
New York Metropolitans players
Leavenworth Soldiers players
Lincoln Tree Planters players
Baseball players from Illinois
People from Toulon, Illinois